Yoo may refer to:
 Yoo (Korean surname), also spelled Ryu or Yu, a Korean family name
 YOO, the IATA code for Oshawa Airport

See also
You, a pronoun